Gertrude W. Hoffmann (born Eliza Gertrude Wesselhoeft; May 17, 1871 – February 13, 1968) was a German-born American character actress who began her Hollywood career as she was entering her later years.

Family
Hoffmann was born on May 17, 1871, at Heidelberg (German Empire), the daughter of Walter and Mary Sara Silver (née Fraser) Wesselhoeft. Her father was a German-born doctor who at the time of her birth had left his medical practice in Halifax, Nova Scotia, behind to volunteer his services after the outbreak of the Franco-Prussian War. He returned to North America in early 1873 and opened a general practice in Cambridge, Massachusetts, where Gertrude was raised along with her six siblings.

Though German by birth, Dr. Wesselhoeft was raised in Cambridge where a number of his relatives had established themselves in the medical community there. He received his medical degree from Harvard University in 1859 and upon graduation began his practice in Halifax. In time he became associated with the Massachusetts Homeopathic Hospital and a frequent lecturer at Boston University Medical School. At the time of his death in 1920, aged 80, Dr. Wesselhoeft was Emeritus Professor of Clinical Medicine in the School of Medicine, a position he had held since 1908.

Mary Fraser was a native of Halifax, and died in 1886, around the age of 40. Dr. Wesselhoeft remarried in 1896 to Mary A. Leavitt, a native of Lowell, Massachusetts, and only a few years older than his eldest child. Gertrude's youngest sister, Eleanor Wesselhoeft (1882–1945), was a stage actress and playwright who also found some success late in life as a character actor in Hollywood. Eleanor was married to Albert Christian Henderson von Tornow (1867–1938), a Shakespearean actor who performed under the stage name Albert Henderson.

Marriage
On June 23, 1894, in Cambridge, Massachusetts, Gertrude married Ralph Hoffmann (1870–1932), a native of Stockbridge, whose family had emigrated from Germany a generation earlier. He was a teacher of natural history and had a keen interest in ornithology. He co-founded the Alstead School of Natural History in Alstead, New Hampshire, and taught there for several summers  while the rest of his year was spent teaching at Buckingham Browne and Nichols in Cambridge.

From the spring of 1910 until 1917, he was headmaster of the Country Day School founded by Vassie Ward (1875-1954) in Kansas City, Missouri.  He later was named director of the Santa Barbara Museum of Natural History in California. Ralph Hoffmann died from a fall while on a scientific expedition to California's Channel Islands in 1932.

The couple had two daughters and a son. Eleanor Hoffmann was born on December 21, 1895, in Belmont, Massachusetts, and died on December 20, 1990, in Santa Barbara, California. Walter Wesselhoeft Hoffmann was born on December 20, 1897, in Belmont, Massachusetts, and died on May 7, 1977, in Cambridge, Massachusetts. The youngest child, Gertrude "Trudy" Hoffmann, was born on April 2, 1904, in Belmont, Massachusetts. Trudy married British composer Sir Arthur Bliss on June 1, 1925, in Santa Barbara, California, and relocated to London, England, where she lived until her death in 2008.

Acting career
Gertrude W. Hoffmann's first Hollywood role was playing Mattie in Before Dawn that premiered on August 4, 1933. She would go on to have a thirty-year career as a character actor appearing in a number of movies and television shows. Among her credits are such films as Alfred Hitchcock's Foreign Correspondent, which was nominated for Best Picture Oscar in 1941, as well as The File on Thelma Jordon (1950), Caged (1950), and The War of the Worlds (1953). She played Mrs. Odetts in the 1950s sitcom My Little Margie and made her final performance in an episode of the sitcom Car 54, Where Are You? that aired in 1963.

Death
Gertrude W. Hoffmann died on February 13, 1968, in Santa Barbara, California. She was interred at Grand View Memorial Park Cemetery in Glendale, California.

Filmography

References

External links

Cine Morgue

1871 births
1968 deaths
American film actresses
American television actresses
German emigrants to the United States
People from Greater Los Angeles
20th-century American actresses
Burials at Grand View Memorial Park Cemetery